After his dominating victory in the previous year, Merckx was the major favourite for the 1970 Tour de France. The main competition was expected from Luis Ocaña and Bernard Thévenet. Early in the race, 86 journalists predicted who would be in the top five of the Tour. 85 of them expected Merckx to be in the top five; Ocana was named by 78, Poulidor by 73. Merckx had already won important races in 1970, including Paris–Roubaix, Paris–Nice, the Giro d'Italia and the Belgian national road championship.
Luis Ocaña, who had won the Critérium du Dauphiné Libéré and the Vuelta a España, suffered from bronchitis, but still started the Tour, unable to seriously challenge Merckx.

The Tour de France started with 15 teams, of 10 cyclists each, from five different countries:

French
 Bic
 Fagor–Mercier
 Frimatic–de Gribaldy–Viva–Wolber
 Peugeot–BP
 Sonolor–Lejeune–Wolber

Italian
 Salvarani
 Molteni
 Scic
 Ferretti

Belgian
 Faema–Faemino
 Mars–Flandria
 Mann–Grundig

Dutch
 Caballero–Laurens
 Willem II–Gazelle
Spanish
 KAS–Kaskol

A few days before the Tour started, it became known that Paul Gutty had failed a doping test when he won the French national road championship. Gutty was removed from his Frimatic team, and replaced by Rene Grelin.

Start list

By team

By rider

By nationality

References

1970 Tour de France
1970